Shinozaki is a Japanese surname. Notable people with the surname include:

, Japanese gravure idol and singer
, Japanese singer and instrumentalist
, Japanese film director
, Japanese spy
, Japanese basketball player
, Japanese golfer
, Japanese motorcycle racer
, Japanese football player
, Japanese volleyball player
Yukiko Shinozaki, Japanese dancer and choreographer

See also
Shinozaki Station, a railway station in Edogawa, Tokyo, Japan

Japanese-language surnames